Yaksa (Yecha) is a Chinese metalcore band that became active in the Beijing rock scene in 1997.

Yaksa was among the first of the wave of metal bands that appeared on the largely underground rock scene in Beijing in the late 1990s. Its original members all came from the interior province of Sichuan. With its thick, powerful sound and ultra-aggressive growling vocals, the band's style was a departure from that of the punk rock bands that were the fad of the moment. Yaksa recorded what is widely regarded as the first Chinese nu metal album, Freedom (自由), released by Scream Records (嚎叫唱片) in 1999. The band followed up their debut three years later with Fa Fa Fa''' (发发发), adding more vocal melody as well as disc scratching and sampling to their sound. In 2006, with Scream Records in shambles, the band independently issued an EP entitled Keep on Fighting, returning to their heavier roots.

 Members 
Hu Song - vocals
Ma Kai - guitar
Ershat Alim - guitar
Zhang Xiaota - bass
Wang Shizhan - drums

 Discography 
 Studio albums Freedom (自由) — 1999, Scream RecordsFa Fa Fa (发发发) —  2002, Scream RecordsKeep on Fighting — 2006, Independent/Freedom Road RecordsYou Aren't the Loser — 2010, Independent LabelUndercurrent (暗流) — 2016, Independent LabelI Am (我即是)'' — 2019, Independent Label

See also 
Chinese rock

References 
  Yaksa @ RiC Wiki, complete biography, discography

External links 
 Official website (archived)
 MySpace page
 Tattoo Studio of Hu Song, Yaksa's vocal
 Tattoo Blog of Hu Song
 Last.fm artist page of Yaksa
 Photo Gallery of YYT of one of Yaksa's Shanghai Gigs (2nd gallery)
 Yaksa in the Tanghui live video

Musical groups established in 1997
Chinese heavy metal musical groups
Groove metal musical groups
Nu metal musical groups
Musical groups from Beijing